Douglas Joseph Daley (1933-1994) was an Australian rugby league player and administrator.

Playing career
Daley was originally from Alstonville, New South Wales and came to the Manly-Warringah Sea Eagles in 1955. He went on to play seven seasons with the club between 1955 and 1961, mainly as a second-row forward. Daley played in the 1957 Grand Final loss to St George Dragons.

Post playing
After his playing career was over, he went into club administration, firstly as treasurer of the Manly club between 1969 and 1984, and then he was promoted to Club Secretary in 1985. He was elevated to the position of CEO at Manly-Warringah Sea Eagles between 1987 and 1992. He was the father of the rugby league footballer; Phil Daley.

Death
Daley died on 22 March 1994, aged 60, after a long battle with cancer.

References

1933 births
1994 deaths
Australian rugby league administrators
Australian rugby league players
Manly Warringah Sea Eagles players
Rugby league players from New South Wales